Else Margarete Barth (3 August 1928, Strinda – 6 January 2015, Groningen) was a Norwegian philosopher.
She was a professor of analytic philosophy at the University of Groningen. 
She was a fellow of the Norwegian Academy of Science and Letters. She was elected a member of the Royal Netherlands Academy of Arts and Sciences in 1978.

Life 
She was professor in analytic philosophy at the University of Groningen, from 1977 till 1993. 
She made important contributions to empirical logic, study of argumentation and feminist philosophy.

In Norway she was best known for her study of Vidkun Quisling's idiosyncratic ideology, "Universism". The book on this topic was expanded and issued in English as A Nazi Interior: Quisling's Hidden Philosophy.

She died in Groningen in January 2015.

Selected publications
The Logic of the Articles in Traditional Philosophy (1974)
From Axiom to Dialogue (with Erik Krabbe, 1982)
Problems, Functions and Semantic Roles (with Rob Wiche, 1986)
Logic and Political Culture (ed. with E.C.W. Krabbe, 1992)
Women Philosophers: A Bibliography of Books (1992)
A Nazi Interior: Quisling's Hidden Philosophy (2003)
Feministische mannen. Nederland in de schaduw van Scandinavië (Feminist Men. The Netherlands in the Shadow of Scandinavia, with Henk Misset, 2010)

References

1928 births
2015 deaths
Norwegian philosophers
Feminist philosophers
Academic staff of the University of Groningen
Norwegian emigrants to the Netherlands
Members of the Norwegian Academy of Science and Letters
Members of the Royal Netherlands Academy of Arts and Sciences
Writers from Trondheim